Battle of the Network Stars is a series of competitions in which television stars from ABC, CBS and NBC would compete in various sporting events. A total of 19 of these competitions were held between 1976 and 1988, all of which were aired by ABC.

In 2003, NBC attempted to revive Battle of the Network Stars with a two-hour special.

In 2005, Bravo premiered a revived version of the show named Battle of the Network Reality Stars. Also in 2005, ESPN premiered a short-lived, sports-themed spinoff version of Battle of the Network Stars as Battle of the Gridiron Stars featuring twenty players from the AFC and NFC competing in a variety of tasks that had nothing to do with football.

In 2017, ABC revived the series as a summer series which ran from June 29 to September 7, 2017.

Broadcast history 
The first Battle was broadcast on ABC starting in November 1976. The program proved popular and continued for an additional eight and a half years, with subsequent episodes airing approximately every six months until May 1985. One final competition aired in December 1988. NBC tried to revive the competition in August 2003 with Tony Potts as host, but with an intra-network contest consisting of personalities from the NBC family of networks. Typically, episodes were aired twice per calendar year, once during the spring and once during the fall during Nielsen Ratings sweeps weeks.

Sports broadcaster Howard Cosell hosted or co-hosted all but one of the first nineteen competitions (he did not host the 1985 edition due to a falling-out with ABC, but he returned for the final edition in 1988), and commented on the action with a semi-serious version of the style for which he was famous.

When ABC revived the program as a weekly series in 2017, Mike Greenberg and Joe Tessitore took over the hosting duties.

Format

1976–1988 
All but one of the competitions took place at the sports facilities of Pepperdine University near Malibu, California, the exception being XVIII which was held in Ixtapa, Mexico.

Each network was represented by eight or ten of its stars from various series, and one of those people from each team would be elected to serve as the network's team captain.

Some of the events were modeled after those used on The Superstars, another Trans World-ABC production that featured athletes from all sports competing against each other for an overall title. Regular events included swimming, kayaking, volleyball, golf, tennis, bowling (on custom-made outdoor lanes), cycling, 3-on-3 football, the baseball dunk, running, and the obstacle course.  Also featured as a regular event was a game of  "Simon Says", directed by Catskill hotel Grossinger's entertainer Lou Goldstein. Each network received points based on how it performed in the event.

After the regular events were over, the lowest scoring network was eliminated from further competition and the two remaining networks determined the day's winner with the final event, the Tug-Of-War.

2017 
Two teams of five celebrities compete each week with a professional athlete as their coach (The coaches return throughout the season). The teams are typically assigned based on the genre or role of the celebrities' notable TV credits. For example, one episode pitted prime-time soap opera stars against actors associated with comedies, while another had had actors who played lawyers vs. those who played White House employees. Teams often include at least one veteran actor or actress who previously competed in the original Battle of the Network Stars and archive footage of their previous appearance(s) is shown. The venue remains Pepperdine University, as was the original.

Rosters

1976–1988 
Battles I-III: Each network had a roster of 10 stars: six men and four women.

Battles IV-VI: Each network had a roster of eight stars: five men and three women.

Battles VII-XIX: Each network had a roster of eight stars: four men and four women.

Events

1976–1988 
Battle I: Swimming Relay, Tennis, Golf, Baseball Dunk, Bicycle Relay, Obstacle Course, Volleyball, Running Relay, Tug-of-War

Battle II: Swimming Relay, Kayak Relay, Baseball Dunk, Obstacle Course, Golf, Running Relay, 3-on-3 Football, Tug-of-war

Battle III: Swimming Relay, Kayak Relay, Bowling, Baseball Dunk, Obstacle Course, Golf, Running Relay, 3-on-3 Football, Tug-of-War

Battle IV: Swimming Relay, Kayak Relay, Frisbee Catch, Baseball Dunk, Obstacle Course, Running Relay, 3-on-3 Football, Tug-of-War

Battles V-VII: Swimming Relay, Kayak Relay, 3-on-3 Football, Baseball Dunk, Obstacle Course, Running Relay, Tug-of-War

Battles VIII-XVII: Swimming Relay, Kayak Relay, 3-on-3 Football, Baseball Dunk, Obstacle Course, Tandem Bike Relay, Running Relay, Tug-of-War

Battle XVIII: Swimming Relay, Running Relay, Beach (Kayak) Relay, Mexican Fishing Boat Race, Tennis, Volleyball, Obstacle Course, Tug-of-War

Battle XIX: Kayak Relay, Swimming Relay, Baseball Dunk, Obstacle Course, Running Relay, Tandem Bike Race, Tug-of-War

2017 
Running Relay, Swimming Relay (2-on-2), Kayak Relay (2-on-2), Baseball Dunk, Tennis (service return), Archery, Soccer (target practice), Basketball (3-point shooting), Golf (closest to pin), Women's Obstacle Course, Men's Obstacle Course, Tug-of-War

Episodes

Battle of the Network Stars I (Nov. 13, 1976)

Battle of the Network Stars II (Feb. 28, 1977)
This edition aired under the title Challenge of the Network Stars.

Battle of the Network Stars III (Nov. 4, 1977)

Battle of the Network Stars IV (May 7, 1978)

Battle of the Network Stars V (Nov. 18, 1978)

Battle of the Network Stars VI (May 7, 1979)

Battle of the Network Stars VII (Nov. 2, 1979)

Battle of the Network Stars VIII (May 4, 1980)

Battle of the Network Stars IX (Dec. 5, 1980)

Battle of the Network Stars X (May 8, 1981)

Battle of the Network Stars XI (Nov. 20, 1981)

Battle of the Network Stars XII (May 5, 1982)

Battle of the Network Stars XIII (Oct. 1, 1982)

Battle of the Network Stars XIV (May 4, 1983)

Battle of the Network Stars XV (Nov. 3, 1983)

Battle of the Network Stars XVI (May 3, 1984)

Battle of the Network Stars XVII (Dec. 20, 1984)

Battle of the Network Stars XVIII (May 23, 1985)

Battle of the Network Stars XIX (Dec. 10, 1988)

Total overall wins – ABC: 7, CBS: 6, NBC: 6

Battle of the Network Stars (2017)
For this edition, rather than the standard network vs. network format, fielding of the teams is based on the TV characters attributed to each celebrity—cops vs. TV sitcoms, White House vs. lawyers, TV moms & dads vs. TV kids, etc.

See also
 Battle of the Network Reality Stars
 Circus of the Stars
 Disney Channel Games
 Laff-A-Lympics
 Star Games
 Second City Television which featured a parody, "Battle of the PBS Stars".
 The Superstars

References

External links

YouTube Video of Simon Says

ABC Sports
American Broadcasting Company original programming
1976 American television series debuts
1988 American television series endings
2017 American television series debuts
2017 American television series endings
American television series revived after cancellation
Wide World of Sports (American TV series)